The 2013–14 Victory Day T20 Cup was a Twenty20 cricket competition that was held in Bangladesh. It was played by four teams, during December 2013. Four Dhaka Premier League teams took part in a lottery to determine who picked one each of the Yellow, Blue, Green and Red teams. Announcing the schedule of the tournament at a press conference on 21 December, the Bangladesh Cricket Board (BCB) confirmed that four teams would participate in the T20 series and AMBER Group would be the title sponsors of the event.

Nasir Hossain was given a leave from the tournament to attend his brother's wedding. Abdur Razzak also missed out due to personal commitment while Shamsur Rahman did not recover sufficiently from an ankle injury. They were replaced by Sharifullah and Naeem Islam jnr.

In the final match, Prime Bank Cricket Club defeated UCB BCB XI by 55 runs to win their Victory Cup title. Rubel Hossain of Prime Bank Cricket Club won the player of the final award for his cheap economic rate of 4.75. Anamul Haque was the leading run scorer in the tournament with 298 runs while the leading wicket-taker was Al-Amin Hossain with 13 wickets including a five-for.

Background 
BCB originally organised the tournament as the preparation and the criteria for selecting players for the 2014 ICC World Twenty20, scheduled to be played in early 2014. The league was competed as an alternative to the 2014 season of Bangladesh Premier League, which was not able to be held following the match fixing scandal. BCB's President Nazmul Hassan Papon said, “We have World Twenty20 ahead, for which the cricketers need to practise. We needed an alternative tournament since we are not able to hold BPL. This is why we took the challenge and arranged the tournament on short notice and we have achieved it,”

The four contested teams were earlier named Red, Green, Yellow and Blue, which had been sold to four different parties. A lottery was held to determine the owners of the team in which Mohammedan Sporting Club got Mashrafe Mortaza's side, Mushfiqur Rahim's team went to Abahani Limited and Prime Bank Cricket Club got the team led by Shakib Al Hasan. In the absence of a fourth interested party, the BCB itself took up the role and took the Tamim Iqbal's team. Soon after however, the BCB received confirmation of United Commercial Bank's interest in taking over the fourth team.

Each of the four teams has three Grade A players, while the remaining members of the squad are of Grade B. The Grade A players will receive 250,000 taka as the tournament fee, while the fees for Grade B has been fixed at 150,000 taka.

Team 
In December 2013, BCB confirmed that the following four teams would take part.

 Abahani Limited
 Mohammedan Sporting Club
 Prime Bank Cricket Club
 UCB BCB XI

Squads 
The followings were the squads of the four teams. Each team consisted of 14 players.

Venues 
The following were the venues of the matches played at this tournament.

Points table 

  advanced to the Final

Tournament summary

Day 1 
The opening match of the tournament began at 13:00 on 22 December at the Sylhet International Cricket Stadium in Sylhet, between Abahani Limited and UCB BCB XI. Abahani Limited batted first and lost their first wicket to the eighth ball of the tournament, resulting it to a score of 139/8, with Aftab Ahmed top-scoring with 33 runs. Abahani Limited could not sustain a partnership with wickets falling regularly throughout the innings. Delwar Hossain picked up 4 wickets as Abahani Limited were restricted to 139 for 8. UCB BCB XI successfully chased the target of 140 after a thriller last over requiring 11 runs, with wicket-keeper Mohammad Mithun top-scoring with 67 runs off just 44 balls. In the second match, Prime Bank Cricket Club batted first and could secure only 126 runs for 7 wickets, though they sustained partnership with high-scoring run rate in the early overs. Elias Sunny's economic 3 wicket haul and two wickets collapse from Alauddin Babu's bowling helped to restrict Prime Bank to 126. In reply, Mohammedan Sporting Club reached the target comfortably with an over remaining as Jaurul Islam struck unbeaten 65 runs off 52 balls.

Day 2 
In the third match, relying on Mushfiqur Rahim's 59 runs from 38 balls and Ziaur Rahman's speedy 24 runs off just 11 balls, Abahani Limited's innings stopped to 172 for 8. The Abahani Limited bowlers combined well to bowl out Mohammedan for just 95 runs in 14.2 overs. Subashis Roy, Farhad Reza, Nabil Samad and Suhrawadi Shuvo took two wickets each. The next match of the tournament saw a big margin of victory by wickets, when Prime Bank Cricket Club chased down the target of 124 losing only 3 wickets in 17.2 overs. Sabbir Rahman's half-century off 41 balls and Shahadat Hossain's three-wicket haul including the prized scalp of Tamim Iqbal gave Prime Bank a 7-wicket victory.

Day 3 
The third day began with Abahani Limited having early batting collapse to fall to 29/2 in their innings against the Prime Bank Cricket Club. Captain Mushfiqur Rahim's  second successive fifty in the tournament helped Abahani Limited recover before their innings ended to 172 for 8. In response, Sabbir Rahman blasted an unbeaten 84 to guide Prime Bank Cricket Club to a four-wicket win over Abahani Limited. The next match was played between UCB BCB XI and Mohammedan Sporting Club, where Mohammedan completed their second victory in the series after beating UCB BCB XI by 7 wickets. Dewan Sabbir's economic four-wicket haul and Mominul Haque's smashing half-ton starred for the winners.

Day 4 
In the following match, UCB BCB XI fought back in a thrilling way by winning over Abahani Limited at a margin of 2 wickets after two consecutive loses in the tournament. Al-Amin Hossain's five wickets in the last over inspired UCB BCB XI to their win, making Al-Amin the first bowler to do so. In the same match, he also made a record for being the first Bangladeshi bowler to take a hat-trick in T20 to his name. The day's second match was full of individual performances and milestones too. Anamul Haque scored a fiery maiden T20 hundred, which helped Prime Bank Cricket Club post 204 for 3 in their 20 overs. Mohammedan Sporting Club, in reply, were bowled out for 45, making it the third largest margin of lose by runs at that time, with Shakib Al Hasan taking six wickets.

Day 5 
Nurul Hasan's unbeaten 79 helped Mohammedan Sporting Club to an eight-wicket win over Abahani Limited in the next match as Mohammedan strengthened their position with a third win. The second match of the day also resulted a high aggregate match, in which UCB BCB XI won by five wickets against Prime Bank Cricket Club. Imrul Kayes's hammering 82 and Mohammad Mithun's 44 helped UCB BCB XI to comeback in the match after losing two wickets in the 4th and 26th ball of the innings respectively.

Day 6 
In the first match of the following day, Prime Bank Cricket Club defeated Abahani Limited by 16 runs as Anamul's bat shone again, scoring 69 runs off 43 balls. While chasing the target of 175, Abahani Limited could not up the run rate for chasing that big total, although they sustained a partnership of the sixth wicket. In the following Tamim Iqbal's blistering 130 off just 64 balls guided UCB BCB XI to post 217 for 4 in their 20 overs. UCB BCB XI's victory confirmed their qualification to the final. Though Mohammedan Sporting Club started well with a view to chasing 217, with Jahurul's smashing 80 off just 39 balls, the continuous batting collapse of the middle order after Jahurul's wicket resulted in UCB BCB XI's 29 runs win.

Day 7 
The final match of the tournament was played between Prime Bank Cricket Club and UCB BCB XI on 31 December 2013. Prime Bank Cricket Club were crowned the champions of the Victory Day T20 Cup. Prime Bank marched to the Victory Day T20 Cup title on the back of a brisk half-century from Liton Das, but Rubel Hossain produced the key contribution with a wicket and two vital, brilliant catches as they beat UCB-BCB XI by 55 runs in front of a decent crowd in Mirpur. Liton Das smashed 62 runs off 39 balls, while Rubel Hossain bagged the vital wicket of Rony Talukdar conceding just 19 runs from 4 overs.

Pool matches

1st T20

2nd T20

3rd T20

4th T20

5th T20

6th T20

7th T20

8th T20

9th T20

10th T20

11th T20

12th T20

Final

Statistics

Most Runs

Most Wickets

Highest team totals

Broadcasting 
On 24 December 2013, Bangladesh Cricket Board (BCB) confirmed deals for telecasting the matches of the tournament and broadcasting rights by an e-mail endorsement.

References

External links 
 Series home at ESPNcricinfo

Bangladeshi domestic cricket competitions
2013 in Bangladeshi cricket